Statistics of Scottish Football League in season 1974–75. At the end of this season, the leagues were reconstructed into three divisions of 10, 14 and 14. This meant that the top ten teams in Division One entered the new Premier Division, while the rest of the Division One clubs entered the new First Division.

Scottish League Division One

Scottish League Division Two

 
Scottish Football League seasons